Lum Pao-Hua (1906–1965) was an Australian born tennis player (born Stephen Gordon Lum) who later represented China. Lum was born in Melbourne and his father was a Chinese born merchant. He modeled his game on Gerald Patterson's. 

In 1928, he moved to China, represented China in Davis Cup, and became a Chinese citizen. While in China, he befriended many famous Chinese people, including the last emperor Puyi. During the War, Lum was spared being tortured by a Japanese general because he wanted to learn to play tennis. 

In 1926, Lum lost in round one of the Australasian championships to Ernest Rowe. At the 1927 Australian championships, Lum beat Jack Cummings. Cummings had just recovered from a bout of scarlet fever and was not at his best. Lum played well, often finishing off points at the net. Lum lost in the quarter finals to James Willard. At the French in 1936, Lum lost in round one to Pierre Goldschmidt. At Wimbledon 1936, Lum lost in round one to Josef Siba. In 1949, Lum moved to Hong Kong.

References

1906 births
1965 deaths
Australian male tennis players
Chinese male tennis players
Tennis players from Melbourne